BOC Kenya plc (BOCKL), also BOC Kenya, is a manufacturing company in Kenya. The company manufactures and markets industrial and medical gases.

Location
The company headquarters are located on Kitui Road, in the Industrial Area of Nairobi, Kenya's capital and largest city. The coordinates of the company headquarters are: 1°18'18.0"S, 36°51'02.0"E (Latitude:-1.304990; Longitude:36.850546).

Overview
BOCKL is a subsidiary of the Linde plc, an international manufacturing and engineering conglomerate founded in Germany in 1879, with subsidiaries in over 100 countries. The company is involved in the production and sale of industrial and medical gases, welding products, power tools and medical equipment.

History 
In December 2005, BOC Kenya plc attempted to take over the shareholding in Carbacid Investments, with the aim of making it a wholly owned subsidiary. However, BOC Kenya did not receive the 80 percent acceptance threshold from Carbacid shareholders, managing only 71 percent. This led to a dispute between BOC Kenya and the Capital Markets Authority. Both the BOC Kenya and Carbacid stocks remained suspended from trading on the NSE from 2005 until 2009 when the hostile takeover offer had lapsed.

Subsidiaries
BOCKL maintains the following registered subsidiaries:

 BOC Tanzania Limited – Dar es Salaam, Tanzania
 BOC Uganda Limited – Kampala, Uganda
 Kivuli Limited – Mombasa, Kenya
 East African Oxygen Limited – Dormant

Ownership
The shares of BOC Kenya plc are listed on the NSE, where they trade under the symbol BOC. The shareholding in the stock of the company are illustrated in the table below:

BOC Holdings is a wholly owned subsidiary of Linde Group.

See also
 Nairobi Securities Exchange
 Economy of Kenya

References

External links
Website of BOC Kenya plc
BOC Kenya, CFC Stanbic chief executives quit

Companies listed on the Nairobi Securities Exchange
Chemical companies of Kenya
Manufacturing companies based in Nairobi
Oxygen
Industrial gases